Riba-roja d'Ebre is a municipality in the comarca of the Ribera d'Ebre in southern Catalonia, Spain. It is the site of a large hydroelectric power station, on the Ebro river. The whole area is mountainous.

See also
Puntal dels Escambrons

References

 Panareda Clopés, Josep Maria; Rios Calvet, Jaume; Rabella Vives, Josep Maria (1989). Guia de Catalunya, Barcelona: Caixa de Catalunya.  (Spanish).  (Catalan).

External links 
  
 Government data pages 

Municipalities in Ribera d'Ebre
Populated places in Ribera d'Ebre